This is a list of mammal species found in the Sumatra, Indonesia.

Order: Proboscidea

Family: Elephantidae

Genus: Elephas

Species: Asian elephant (Elephas maximus) EN/en

Order Sirenia

Family Dugongidae

Genus: Dugong

Species: Dugong (Dugong dugon) VU/vu

Order Eulipotyphla

Family: Erinaceidae

Genus: Echinosorex

Species: Moonrat (Echinosorex gymnura) LC/lc

Genus: Hylomys

Species: Dwarf gymnure (Hylomys parvus) VU/vu

Species: Short-tailed gymnure (Hylomys suillus) LC/lc

Family: Soricidae (shrews)

Genus: Chimarrogale

Species: Sumatran water shrew (Chimarrogale sumatrana) CR/cr

Genus: Crocidura

Species: Beccari's shrew (Crocidura beccarii) LC/lc

Species: Hutan shrew (Crocidura hutanis) LC/lc

Species: Sumatran giant shrew (Crocidura lepidura) LC/lc

Species: Sunda shrew (Crocidura monticola) LC/LC

Species: Sumatran long-tailed shrew (Crocidura paradoxura) LC/lc

Species: Banka shrew (Crocidura vosmaeri) DD/dd

Order Chiroptera

Family: Pteropodidae

Genus: Aethalops

Species: Pygmy fruit bat (Aethalops alecto) LC/

Genus: Balionycteris

Species: Spotted-winged fruit bat (Balionycteris maculata) LC/

Genus: Chironax

Species: Black-capped fruit bat (Chironax melanocephalus) LC/

Genus: Cynopterus

Species: Lesser short-nosed fruit bat (Cynopterus brachyotis) LC/

Species: Horsfield's fruit bat (Cynopterus horsfieldi) LC/

Species: Minute fruit bat (Cynopterus minutus) LC/

Species: Greater short-nosed fruit bat (Cynopterus sphinx) LC/

Species: Indonesian short-nosed fruit bat (Cynopterus titthaecheileus) LC/

Genus: Dyacopterus

Species: Brooks's dyak fruit bat (Dyacopterus brooksi) VU/

Species: Dayak fruit bat (Dyacopterus spadiceus) NT/

Genus: Eonycteris

Species: Cave nectar bat (Eonycteris spelaea) LC/

Genus: Macroglossus

Species: Long-tongued nectar bat (Macroglossus minimus) LC/lc

Species: Long-tongued fruit bat (Macroglossus sobrinus) LC/lc

Genus: Megaerops

Species: Tailless fruit bat (Megaerops ecaudatus) LC/lc

Species: White-collared fruit bat (Megaerops wetmorei) VU/vu

Genus: Penthetor

Species: Dusky fruit bat (Penthetor lucasi) LC/lc

Genus: Pteropus

Species: Black-eared flying fox (Pteropus melanotus) CR/cr

Species: Large flying fox (Pteropus vampyrus) NT/nt

Genus: Rousettus

Species: Geoffroy's rousette (Rousettus amplexicaudatus) LC/lc

Species: Leschenault's rousette (Rousettus leschenaulti) LC/lc

Family Megadermatidae

Genus: Megaderma

Species: Lesser false vampire bat (Megaderma spasma) LC/lc

Family Rhinolophidae

Genus: Rhinolophus

Species: Acuminate horseshoe bat (Rhinolophus acuminatus) LC/lc

Species: Arcuate horseshoe bat (Rhinolophus arcuatus) LC/lc

Species: Blyth's horseshoe bat (Rhinolophus lepidus) LC/lc

Species: Woolly horseshoe bat (Rhinolophus luctus) LC/lc

Species: Big-eared horseshoe bat (Rhinolophus macrotis) LC/lc

Species: Lesser brown horseshoe bat (Rhinolophus stheno) LC/lc

Species: Trefoil horseshoe bat (Rhinolophus trifoliatus) LC/lc

Family Hipposideridae

Genus: Coelops

Species: East Asian tailless leaf-nosed bat (Coelops frithii) LC/lc

Genus: Hipposideros

Species: Dusky roundleaf bat (Hipposideros ater) LC/lc

Species: Bicolored roundleaf bat (Hipposideros bicolor) LC/lc

Species: Short-headed roundleaf bat (Hipposideros breviceps) VU/vu

Species: Fawn leaf-nosed bat (Hipposideros cervinus) LC/lc

Species: Ashy roundleaf bat (Hipposideros cineraceus) LC/lc

Species: Diadem leaf-nosed bat (Hipposideros diadema) LC/lc

Species: Borneo roundleaf bat (Hipposideros doriae) NT/nt

Species: Cantor's roundleaf bat (Hipposideros galeritus) LC/lc

Species: Intermediate roundleaf bat (Hipposideros larvatus) LC/lc

Species: Orbiculus leaf-nosed bat (Hipposideros orbiculus) EN/en

Family Emballonuridae

Genus: Emballonura

Species: Lesser sheath-tailed bat (Emballonura monticola) LC/lc

Genus: Saccolaimus

Species: Naked-rumped pouched bat (Saccolaimus saccolaimus) LC/lc

Genus: Taphozous

Species: Long-winged tomb bat (Taphozous longimanus) LC/lc

Species: Black-bearded tomb bat (Taphozous melanopogon) LC/lc

Family: Nycteridae

Genus: Nycteris

Species: Malayan slit-faced bat (Nycteris tragata) LC/lc

Family: Molossidae

Genus: Chaerephon

Species: Northern free-tailed bat (Chaerephon johorensis) VU/vu

Genus: Cheiromeles

Species: Hairless bat (Cheiromeles torquatus) LC/lc

Genus: Mops

Species: Malayan free-tailed bat (Mops mops) LC/lc

Genus: Mormopterus

Species: Sumatran mastiff bat (Mormopterus doriae) DD/dd

Family Vespertilionidae

Genus: Glischropus

Species: Common thick-thumbed bat (Glischropus tylopus) LC/lc

Genus: Harpiocephalus

Species: Lesser hairy-winged bat (Harpiocephalus harpia) LC/lc

Genus: Hypsugo

Species: Big-eared pipistrelle (Hypsugo macrotis) DD/dd

Genus: Kerivoula

Species: Hardwicke's woolly bat (Kerivoula hardwickii) LC/lc

Species: Papillose woolly bat (Kerivoula papillosa) LC/lc

Species: Clear-winged woolly bat (Kerivoula pellucida) LC/lc

Species: Painted bat (Kerivoula picta) LC/lc

Genus: Miniopterus

Species: Small bent-winged bat (Miniopterus pusillus) LC/lc

Genus: Murina

Species: Round-eared tube-nosed bat (Murina cyclotis) LC/lc

Species: Brown tube-nosed bat (Murina suilla) LC/lc

Genus: Myotis

Species: Peters's myotis (Myotis ater) LC/lc

Species: Hodgson's bat (Myotis formosus) LC/lc

Species: Lesser large-footed bat (Myotis hasseltii) LC/lc

Species: Herman's myotis (Myotis hermani) DD/dd

Genus: Phoniscus

Species: Groove-toothed bat (Phoniscus atrox) NT/nt

Genus: Pipistrellus

Species: Narrow-winged pipistrelle (Pipistrellus stenopterus) LC/lc

Species: Least pipistrelle (Pipistrellus tenuis) LC/lc

Genus: Tylonycteris

Species: Lesser bamboo bat (Tylonycteris pachypus) LC/lc

Species: Greater bamboo bat (Tylonycteris robustula) LC/lc

Order Pholidota

Family Manidae

Genus: Manis

Species: Sunda pangolin (Manis javanica) CR/cr

Order Carnivora

Family Felidae

Genus: Catopuma

Species: Asian golden cat (Catopuma temminckii) NT/

Genus: Pardofelis

Species: Marbled cat (Pardofelis marmorata) VU/

Genus: Neofelis

Species: Sunda clouded leopard (Neofelis diardi) VU/

Genus: Panthera

Species: Tiger (Panthera tigris) EN/

Genus: Prionailurus

Species: Sunda leopard cat (Prionailurus javanensis) LC/

Species: Flat-headed cat (Prionailurus planiceps) EN/

Species: Fishing cat (Prionailurus viverrinus) EN/
Note: Occurrence of fishing cat in Sumatra still considered unknown caused by lack of recent records from Sumatra. Survey based on objectively verifiable record urgently needed for this species.

Family Viverridae

Genus: Arctictis

Species: Binturong (Arctictis binturong) VU/

Genus: Arctogalidia

Species: Small-toothed palm civet (Arctogalidia trivirgata) LC/

Genus: Cynogale

Species: Otter civet (Cynogale bennettii) EN/

Genus: Hemigalus

Species: Banded palm civet (Hemigalus derbyanus) VU/

Genus: Paguma

Species: Masked palm civet (Paguma larvata) LC/

Genus: Paradoxurus

Species: Asian palm civet (Paradoxurus hermaphrodites) LC/

Genus: Viverra

Species: Malayan civet (Viverra tangalunga) LC/

Genus: Viverricula

Species: Small Indian civet (Viverricula indica) LC/
Note: Its current status and species presence on Sumatra still unclear. Only few published record reported species existence on northern Sumatra, and none of them came from southern Sumatra. Further verification and confirmation required.

Family Prionodontidae

Genus: Prionodon

Species: Banded linsang (Prionodon linsang) LC/

Family Herpestidae

Genus: Herpestes

Species: Short-tailed mongoose (Herpestes brachyurus) LC/

Species: Javan mongoose (Herpestes javanicus) LC/

Species: Collared mongoose (Herpestes semitorquatus) DD/

Family Ursidae

Genus: Helarctos

Species: Sun bear (Helarctos malayanus) VU/

Family Canidae

Genus: Cuon

Species: Dhole (Cuon alpinus) EN/

Family: Mustelidae

Genus: Amblonyx

Species: Oriental small-clawed otter (Aonyx cinereus) VU/

Genus: Arctonyx

Species: Hog badger (Arctonyx collaris) NT/

Genus: Lutra

Species: Eurasian otter (Lutra lutra) EN/

Species: Hairy-nosed otter (Lutra sumatrana) EN/

Genus: Lutrogale

Species: Smooth-coated otter (Lutrogale perspicillata) VU/

Genus: Martes

Species: Yellow-throated marten (Martes flavigula) LC/

Genus: Mustela

Species: Indonesian mountain weasel (Mustela lutreolina) DD/

Species: Malayan weasel (Mustela nudipes) LC/

Family Mephitidae

Genus: Mydaus

Species: Sunda stink badger (Mydaus javanensis) LC/

Order Perissodactyla

Family Rhinocerotidae

Genus: Dicerorhinus

Species: Sumatran rhinoceros (Dicerorhinus sumatrensis) CR/cr

Family Tapiridae

Genus: Tapirus

Species: Malayan tapir (Tapirus indicus) EN/en

Order Artiodactyla

Family Suidae

Genus: Sus

Species: Bornean bearded pig (Sus barbatus) VU/

Species: Wild boar (Sus scrofa) LC/

Family Tragulidae

Genus: Tragulus

Species: Lesser mouse-deer (Tragulus kanchil) LC/

Species: Greater mouse-deer (Tragulus napu) LC/

Family Bovidae

Genus: Capricornis

Species: Sumatran serow (Capricornis sumatraensis) VU/

Family Cervidae

Genus: Rusa

Species: Sambar deer (Rusa unicolor) VU/

Genus: Muntiacus

Species: Sumatran muntjac (Muntiacus montanus) DD/

Species: Indian muntjac (Muntiacus muntjak) LC/

Order Lagomorpha

Family Leporidae

Genus: Nesolagus

Species: Sumatran striped rabbit (Nesolagus netscheri) VU/

Order Rodentia

Family Hystricidae

Genus: Atherurus

Species: Asiatic brush-tailed porcupine (Atherurus macrourus) LC/
Note: Presence on the island of Sumatra still unclear and further verification required.

Genus: Hystrix

Species: Malayan porcupine (Hystrix brachyura) LC/

Species: Sumatran porcupine (Hystrix sumatrae) LC/

Genus: Trichys

Species: Long-tailed porcupine (Trichys fasciculata) LC/

Family Sciuridae

Genus: Aeromys

Species: Black flying squirrel (Aeromys tephromelas) DD/

Genus: Callosciurus

Species: Kloss's squirrel (Callosciurus albescens) DD/

Species: Mentawai squirrel (Callosciurus melanogaster) VU/

Species: Black-striped squirrel (Callosciurus nigrovittatus) NT/

Species: Plantain squirrel (Callosciurus notatus) LC/

Species: Prevost's squirrel (Callosciurus prevostii) LC/

Genus: Exilisciurus

Species: Least pygmy squirrel (Exilisciurus exilis) DD/

Genus: Hylopetes

Species: Gray-cheeked flying squirrel (Hylopetes lepidus) DD/

Species: Jentink's flying squirrel (Hylopetes platyurus) DD/

Species: Sipora flying squirrel (Hylopetes sipora) EN/

Species: Red-cheeked flying squirrel (Hylopetes spadiceus) LC/

Species: Sumatran flying squirrel (Hylopetes winstoni) DD/

Genus: Iomys

Species: Javanese flying squirrel (Iomys horsfieldii) LC/

Species: Mentawi flying squirrel (Iomys sipora) EN/

Genus: Lariscus

Species: Three-striped ground squirrel (Lariscus insignis) LC/

Species: Niobe ground squirrel (Lariscus niobe) DD/

Species: Mentawai three-striped squirrel (Lariscus obscurus) NT/

Genus: Petaurista

Species: Spotted giant flying squirrel (Petaurista elegans) LC/

Genus: Petinomys

Species: Whiskered flying squirrel (Petinomys genibarbis) VU/

Species: Hagen's flying squirrel (Petinomys hageni) DD/

Species: Siberut flying squirrel (Petinomys lugens) EN/

Species: Temminck's flying squirrel (Petinomys setosus) VU/

Species: Vordermann's flying squirrel (Petinomys vordermanni) VU/

Genus: Pteromyscus

Species: Smoky flying squirrel (Pteromyscus pulverulentus) EN/

Genus: Ratufa

Species: Cream-coloured giant squirrel (Ratufa affinis) NT/

Species: Black giant squirrel (Ratufa bicolor) NT/

Genus: Rhinosciurus

Species: Shrew-faced squirrel (Rhinosciurus laticaudatus) NT/

Genus: Sundasciurus

Species: Fraternal squirrel (Sundasciurus fraterculus) EN/

Species: Horse-tailed squirrel (Sundasciurus hippurus) NT/

Species: Low's squirrel (Sundasciurus lowii) LC/

Species: Slender squirrel (Sundasciurus tenuis) LC/

Family Spalacidae

Genus: Rhizomys

Species: Large bamboo rat (Rhizomys sumatrensis) LC/

Family Muridae

Genus: Berylmys

Species: Bower's white-toothed rat (Berylmys bowersi) LC/

Genus: Chiropodomys

Species: Indomalayan pencil-tailed tree mouse (Chiropodomys gliroides) LC/

Species: Koopman's pencil-tailed tree mouse (Chiropodomys karlkoopmani) EN/

Genus: Leopoldamys

Species: Sundaic mountain leopoldamys (Leopoldamys ciliatus) LC/

Species: Long-tailed giant rat (Leopoldamys sabanus) LC/

Species: Mentawai long-tailed giant rat (Leopoldamys siporanus) EN/

Genus: Maxomys

Species: Sumatran spiny rat (Maxomys hylomyoides) NT/

Species: Fat-nosed spiny rat (Maxomys inflatus) VU/

Species: Pagai spiny rat (Maxomys pagensis) EN/

Species: Rajah spiny rat (Maxomys rajah) VU/

Species: Red spiny rat (Maxomys surifer) LC/

Species: Whitehead's spiny rat (Maxomys whiteheadi) VU/

Genus: Mus

Species: Sumatran shrewlike mouse (Mus crociduroides) LC/

Genus: Niviventer

Species: Dark-tailed tree rat (Niviventer cremoriventer) VU/

Species: Montane Sumatran white-bellied rat (Niviventer fraternus) LC/

Species: Chestnut white-bellied rat (Niviventer fulvescens) LC/

Genus: Rattus

Species: Sunburned rat (Rattus adustus) DD/

Species: Annandale's rat (Rattus annandalei) LC/

Species: Ricefield rat (Rattus argentiventer) LC/

Species: Enggano rat (Rattus enganus) CR/

Species: Hoogerwerf's rat (Rattus hoogerwerfi) VU/

Species: Korinch's rat (Rattus korinchi) LC/

Species: Mentawai rat (Rattus lugens) LC/

Species: Simalur rat (Rattus simalurensis) LC/

Genus: Sundamys

Species: Mountain giant Sunda rat (Sundamys infraluteus) LC/

Species: Müller's giant Sunda rat (Sundamys muelleri) LC/

Order Scandentia

Family Tupaiidae

Genus: Tupaia

Species: Golden-bellied treeshrew (Tupaia chrysogaster) EN/

Species: Common treeshrew (Tupaia glis) LC/

Species: Slender treeshrew (Tupaia gracilis) LC/

Species: Horsfield's treeshrew (Tupaia javanica) LC/

Species: Pygmy treeshrew (Tupaia minor) LC/

Species: Large treeshrew (Tupaia tana) LC/

Family Ptilocercidae

Genus: Ptilocercus

Species: Pen-tailed treeshrew (Ptilocercus lowii) LC/

Order Dermoptera

Family Cynocephalidae

Genus: Galeopterus

Species: Sunda flying lemur (Galeopterus variegatus) LC/

Order Primates

Family Lorisidae

Genus: Nycticebus

Species: Bangka slow loris (Nycticebus bancanus)

Species: Sunda slow loris (Nycticebus coucang)

Family Tarsiidae

Genus: Cephalopachus

Species: Horsfield's tarsier (Cephalopachus bancanus) VU/

Family Cercopithecidae

Genus: Macaca

Species: Crab-eating macaque (Macaca fascicularis) LC/

Species: Southern pig-tailed macaque (Macaca nemestrina) VU/

Species: Pagai Island macaque (Macaca pagensis) CR/

Species: Siberut macaque (Macaca siberu) VU/

Genus: Presbytis

Species: Banded surili (Presbytis femoralis) NT/

Species: Sumatran surili (Presbytis melalophos) EN/

Species: Mentawai langur (Presbytis potenziani) EN/

Species: White-thighed surili (Presbytis siamensis) NT/

Species: Thomas's langur (Presbytis thomasi) VU/

Genus: Simias

Species: Pig-tailed langur (Simias concolor) CR/

Genus: Trachypithecus

Species: Silvery lutung (Trachypithecus cristatus) NT/

Family Hylobatidae

Genus: Hylobates

Species: Agile gibbon (Hylobates agilis) EN/

Species: Kloss's gibbon (Hylobates klossii) EN/

Species: Lar gibbon (Hylobates lar) EN/

Genus: Symphalangus

Species: Siamang (Symphalangus syndactylus) EN/

Family Hominidae

Genus: Pongo

Species: Sumatran orangutan (Pongo abelii) CR/

Species: Tapanuli orangutan (Pongo tapanuliensis) CR/

Notes

References
Agustinus Suyanto, Masaaki Yoneda, Ibnu Maryanto, Maharadatunkamsi and Jito Sugardjito (2002). "Checklist of The Mammals of Indonesia: Scientific name and distribution area table in Indonesia including CITES, IUCN and Indonesian category for conservation". LIPI-JICA-PHKA. 

Fauna of Sumatra
Mammals of Indonesia
Sumatra